Saturn Airways (ICAO designator: KS, and Callsign: Saturn) was a US "supplemental carrier", i.e. a charter airline. It operated from 1948 until 1976. Its headquarters were located on the grounds of Oakland International Airport, Oakland, California.

History 
The airline was initially known as All American Airways based at Oakland Airport and used Curtiss C-46 Commando aircraft.  In 1959 it became known as Saturn Airways and began operating Douglas DC-6C planes.  Larger Douglas DC-7C aircraft were purchased in 1963 from BOAC and were operated on transatlantic passenger charter flights.  In 1965 Saturn acquired AAXICO Airlines. 

In December 1967 and January 1968, respectively, Saturn took delivery of two Douglas DC-8 Super 61CF jets.  This allowed it to operate transcontinental cargo and charter flights, some of which included military flights to Vietnam.  Between 1968 and 1974 it had two DC-8 Series 50 planes in its inventory and added a third Super 61CF in 1972.  After absorbing the assets of defunct Universal Airlines in May 1972, it added nine Lockheed L-188 Electra aircraft to its fleet. Saturn also operated nineteen Lockheed Hercules aircraft.

Saturn was finally absorbed by Trans International Airlines in December 1976, making Trans International the largest air cargo operation at the time.

The Triple Crown winning racehorse, Secretariat, was flown to Ontario, Canada on a Saturn Airways charter to run in his last race.

Fleet

Douglas DC-6C and Douglas DC-6B "Skymaster"
Douglas DC-7C "Seven Seas"
Douglas DC-8-61F
Lockheed L-100 Hercules
Lockheed L-188 Electra

Accidents and incidents
May 23, 1974
Time: 16:55
Location: Springfield, Illinois
Operator: Saturn Airways
Route: Alameda, California to Indianapolis, Indiana
AC Type: Lockheed L-100-30 Hercules
Registration: N14ST
Aboard: 3 (passengers: 1 crew: 2)
Fatalities: 3 (passengers: 1 crew: 2)
Ground: 0
Summary: While en route the left wing separated from the aircraft. The plane crashed out of control. The undiscovered, preexisting fatigue cracks, which reduced the strength of the left wing to the degree that it failed as a result of positive aerodynamic loads created by moderate turbulence.

January 31, 1967
Time: 03:20
Type: Douglas DC-6A
Operator: Saturn Airways
Registration: N640NA
C/N / msn: 45475/973
Crew: Fatalities: 3 / Occupants: 3
Passengers: Fatalities: 0 / Occupants: 0
Total: Fatalities: 3 / Occupants: 3
Airplane damage: Written off
Location: San Antonio International Airport, Texas (SAT) (United States) show on map
Phase: Approach
Nature: Cargo
Departure airport: ?
Destination airport: San Antonio-Kelly AFB, Texas (SKF/KSKF), United States
Narrative: The Saturn DC-6 was operating on a cargo flight to Kelly AFB. The crew decided to divert to civilian international airport at San Antonio and commenced the approach. The airplane descended 1100 feet below the glide slope, flew through trees and collided with a cliff.

Probable cause: "Undetermined".

See also 
 List of defunct airlines of the United States

References

External links

Airliners.net photos
Fleet and code data
In Memoriam

Defunct airlines of the United States
Airlines established in 1948
Airlines disestablished in 1976
American companies established in 1948
1976 mergers and acquisitions
1948 establishments in California
1976 disestablishments in California
Airlines based in California